The 1998 World Weightlifting Championships were held in Lahti, Finland from November 7 to November 15. The men's competition in the heavyweight (– 105 kg) division was staged on 15 November 1998.

Medalists

Records

Results

References
Results
Weightlifting World Championships Seniors Statistics, Pages 17–18 

1998 World Weightlifting Championships